Oblplan House is a residential building in neoclassical style. It is located in Tsentralny City District of Novosibirsk, Russia, on Krasny Avenue. The building was built in 1939. Architect: N. S. Kuzmin.

Location
The building is located on Krasny Avenue opposite Kuzbassugol Building Complex.

Gallery

Notable residents
 Alexander Logvinenko (1903–2000) is a Soviet scientist in the field of chemistry and technology of mineral processing. He lived in the house from 1951 to 2000.
 Andrey Novikov (1909–1979) is a Soviet composer and conductor. He lived in the building from 1972 to 1979.

See also
 Oblpotrebsoyuz Building
 House of Socialist Agriculture

References

Tsentralny City District, Novosibirsk
Buildings and structures in Novosibirsk
Residential buildings completed in 1939
Neoclassical architecture in Russia
Buildings and structures built in the Soviet Union
Cultural heritage monuments of regional significance in Novosibirsk Oblast